Axe Records is a Canadian record label founded by Greg Hambleton in 1972.  After a number of years of inactivity, the label was revived in 2013.  It is particularly notable as the original recording label of Canadian duo Gary and Dave.

History

Axe Records was founded by Greg Hambleton in 1972.  The label was initially distributed by London Records of Canada.  The first artists signed to the label included Canadian group Thundermug.  In 1974 Axe moved into offices in the Toronto Sound Studio building on Overlea Boulevard.

By 1975, the label was distributed by GRT Records in Canada. The company had no consistent international distribution. The company's most successful artist duo, Gary and Dave, was distributed by London Records in the United States.  Its principal rock band, Thundermug, was distributed by the Big Tree and the Epic labels and, as of 1975, at the initiative of Hambleton, by Mercury Records.  International licensing arrangements were signed with EMI Electrola, Basart and Decca UK.

The label's major recording success was with Gary and Dave.  The label also released records by Thundermug, Fergus, The Sattalites, Rain (with Charity Brown), Keith Hampshire, Major Hoople's Boarding House, Steel River, Tom Northcott and Walter Ostanek, among others.

In 2013, the label was revived by its founder and owner, Greg Hambleton, to re-issue and market the original recordings by its original artists, as well as to sign new artists.

References

External links
 

Record labels established in 1972